Graham Michael Pountney (born 6 February 1953) is a British actor.

His television credits include: Angels, The Cleopatras, Howards' Way, Peak Practice, Doctors, Sea of Souls, Hustle and New Tricks.

References

External links
 Official website
 

1953 births
Living people
English male television actors
English male voice actors